Silberman or Silbermann is a German surname meaning "silver man". Notable people with the surname include:

Silberman 
Benedict Silberman (1901–1971), composer and conductor
Charles E. Silberman (1925–2011), American journalist
Curt Silberman (1908-2002), attorney and member of Jewish organizations in Germany and the U.S.
Jerome Silberman (1933–2016), American actor known professionally as Gene Wilder
Laurence Silberman (1935–2022), American federal judge
Linda J. Silberman, American lawyer
Neil Asher Silberman (born 1950), archaeologist and historian
Robert S. Silberman (born 1957), a U.S. Assistant Secretary of the Army
Rosalie Silberman Abella (born 1946), Canadian jurist
Serge Silberman (1917–2003), French film producer
Steve Silberman, American journalist and author

Silbermann 
Alphons Silbermann (1909–2000), German Jewish sociologist, musicologist, entrepreneur and publicist
Ben Silbermann (born 1982), co-founder of Pinterest
Gottfried Silbermann (1683–1753), German builder of pipe organs
Andreas Silbermann (1678–1734), German builder of pipe organs, older brother of Gottfried
Johann Andreas Silbermann (1712–1783), German builder of pipe organs, son of Andreas
Heinrich Silbermann, Romanian chess master
Jake Silbermann (born 1983), American actor who plays Noah Mayer on the soap opera As the World Turns

Fictional characters 
Dr. Peter Silberman, fictional character from the Terminator franchise

See also
Silverman
Victor Zilberman (born 1947), Romanian boxer
Noam Zylberman (1987–1990), Canadian voice actor
LEO (spacecraft) nicknamed Silvermann

German-language surnames
Yiddish words and phrases
Yiddish-language surnames